My Wife, the Impostor is a 1931 German comedy film directed by Kurt Gerron and starring Heinz Rühmann, Käthe von Nagy and Fritz Grünbaum. It was shot at the Babelsberg Studios in Berlin. The film's sets were designed by the art director Otto Erdmann and Hans Sohnle. A separate French-language version was also made, with a different cast.

Cast
 Heinz Rühmann as Peter Bergmann, Bankbeamter
 Käthe von Nagy as Jutta Bergmann, seine Frau
 Fritz Grünbaum as Silbermann, ein Agent
 Hermann Vallentin as Marty, Würstchen en gros
 Alfred Abel as Mr. Knast, Senf en gros
 Maly Delschaft as Ileana
 Theo Lingen as Manager Ileanas
 Hans Wassmann as Dr. Sommer, Nervenarzt
 Fritz Albertia as Direktor der Landeskreditbank
 Else Heimsas as Frau Klaffke, Zimmervermieterin
 Edith Meinhard
 Ernst Wurmser
 Hubert von Meyerinck
 Georg Schmieter
 Walter Eckard
 Julius Brandt
 Georg H. Schnell

References

Bibliography

External links 
 

1931 films
Films of the Weimar Republic
German comedy films
1931 comedy films
1930s German-language films
German multilingual films
UFA GmbH films
German black-and-white films
1931 multilingual films
Films shot at Babelsberg Studios
1930s German films